Scattered Crumbs: is a novel written by the Iraqi author Muhsin al-Ramli.

Al-Ramli's first novel, Scattered Crumbs (al-Fatit al-mubaʿthar), was published in Arabic in 2000, and its 2003 English translation received the Arabic Translation Award from the University of Arkansas Press.

Set in an Iraqi village during the Iran-Iraq war, Scattered Crumbs critiques a totalitarian dictatorship through the stories of an impoverished peasant family. A father, a fierce supporter of Saddam Hussein clashes with his artist son, who loves his homeland but finds himself literally unable to paint the Leader's portrait for his father's wall.

External links
 Review / Scattered Crumbs / Family Matters / by Harold Braswell
 from Scattered Crumbs by Muhsin Al-Ramli
 Scattered Crumbs, in Books.google.es

Arabic-language novels
2000 novels
Iraqi novels
Novels set in Iraq